Greatest Hits is a greatest hits album by Swedish group Ace of Base. It is their second compilation with this title, the first being Arista's 2000 US release Greatest Hits (2000). It was released under Playground Music on 14 November 2008, and is the last album to be released under the original contract of five original albums. The compilation was released in multiple formats, including a single disc edition and a 2-CD+DVD compilation which includes 16 of their hits, 13 previously released remixes, and 17 music videos. The set also includes four newly recorded remakes of hit songs. Beside previously unreleased songs included on the 2015 compilation album Hidden Gems, this is the last Ace of Base album to date with new material to feature vocalist Jenny Berggren.

In 2019, the collection was repackaged with Hidden Gems instead of the DVD and released as Ace of Base – Gold in the United Kingdom. The re-release charted 59 for one week in the UK and thus was Ace of Base's return to the charts since their 2010 album The Golden Ratio worldwide and since the 1999 compilation Singles of the 90s in the UK.

Background
The project was initially conceived as Ace of Base's fifth studio album, to consist of seven new songs and seven re-recordings of hit songs. The remakes were created to give the songs a more modern feel. According to Ulf Ekberg, the compilation was a contract obligation and halted plans for the band's then-upcoming album. Though Linn's image appears on the cover of the compilation, she is not featured on any of the new material.

The set includes re-recorded versions of the songs "Wheel of Fortune" and "Don't Turn Around", while the version released internationally on iTunes includes a remake of "Lucky Love", and the Japanese edition includes a new version of "The Sign". An expanded version of the remixes portion called "Classic Remixes Extended" was later released to iTunes, consisting of 44 previously released remixes.

Track listings

Greatest Hits

Classic Remixes

Notes
 signifies a remixer
 signifies an assistant producer
 signifies a vocal producer
 signifies a co-producer

Classic Remixes Extended (iTunes)
The Sign – Ultimix – 6:48
The Sign – Dub Version – 5:08
All That She Wants – 12" Version – 6:46
Lucky Love – Frankie Knuckles Classic Club Mix – 7:23
Lucky Love – Amadin Remix – 5:43
Lucky Love – Armand's British Nites Remix – 11:22
Lucky Love – Vission Lorimer Funkdified Mix – 6:04
Lucky Love – Lenny B's Club Mix – 7:09
Happy Nation – Gold Zone Club Mix – 5:41
Everytime It Rains – Soul Poets Club Mix – 4:22
Life Is a Flower – Absolom Short Edit – 5:19
Life Is a Flower – Milk Long Edit – 5:14
Life Is a Flower – Sweetbox Mix 1 – 6:16
Wheel of Fortune – 12" Mix – 5:27
Hallo Hallo – Hitvision Radio Edit – 3:06
Hallo Hallo – Dub – 4:46
Beautiful Life – Junior's Circuit Bump Mix – 8:20
Beautiful Life – Vission Lorimer Club Mix – 7:01
Beautiful Life – Uno Clio Mix – 8:23
Never Gonna Say I'm Sorry – Lenny B's Club Mix – 8:25
Never Gonna Say I'm Sorry – Lenny B's Organ-ic House Mix – 7:15
Don't Turn Around – Turned Out Eurodub – 7:26
Don't Turn Around – Groove Mix Extended – 5:19
Cruel Summer – Cutfather & Joe Mix – 3:341
Cruel Summer – Hartmann & Langhoff Short Mix – 3:21
Cruel Summer – KLM Club Mix – 10:29
Cruel Summer – Hani Num Club Mix – 8:13
Cruel Summer – Blazin' Rhythm Remix – 3:21
Whenever You're Near Me – Strobe's Radio Remix – 3:23
Whenever You're Near Me – Strobe's Lollipop Mix – 3:27
Whenever You're Near Me – Nikolas & Sibley Dance Mix – 8:55
Living in Danger – Old School Mix – 4:49
Living in Danger – Principle Mix – 8:53
Living in Danger – Buddha Mix – 3:38
Beautiful Morning – Spanish Fly Radio Edit – 2:57
Beautiful Morning – Groove Radio Edit – 2:47
Unspeakable – Junk&Function/M12 Club Mix – 3:05
Unspeakable – Fairlite Radio Mix – 3:18
Unspeakable – Filur Radio Mix – 3:28
Travel to Romantis – Josef Larossi Mix – 5:35
Travel to Romantis – Love to Infinity Mix – 7:22
Travel to Romantis – Wolf Mix – 4:03
Never Gonna Say I'm Sorry – Long Version – 6:34
Never Gonna Say I'm Sorry – Rock Version – 4:02

1Cruel Summer – Cutfather & Joe Mix is the album version of the song

DVD
All That She Wants
Wheel of fortune
Happy Nation
The Sign
Don't Turn Around
Living in Danger
Lucky Love
Beautiful Life
Never Gonna Say I'm Sorry
Life Is a Flower
Cruel Summer (Big Bonus Mix)
Travel to romantis
Always Have, Always Will
C’est la vie (Always 21)
Beautiful Morning
Lucky Love (Acoustic)1
Unspeakable

Notes
 DVD is in NTSC format only.
1This is not the US version of the video. Instead, it is an alternate edit of the original European video featuring the acoustic version of the song.

Charts

References

Ace of Base compilation albums
Ace of Base video albums
2008 greatest hits albums
2008 remix albums
2008 video albums
Music video compilation albums